Kevin Abrams may refer to:

 Kevin Abrams (American football executive), New York Giants Assistant General Manager
 Kevin Abrams (cornerback) (born 1974), American former NFL cornerback
 Kevin Abrams, a Canadian–Israeli writer and coauthor of The Pink Swastika